The Highlander Stakes is a Thoroughbred horse race run annually at Woodbine Racetrack in Toronto, Ontario, Canada. Run in mid to late June, the Grade II race is open to horses aged three and older. Raced over a distance of six furlongs on turf, it currently offers a purse of $250,000.

Inaugurated in 1954 as the Highlander Handicap at Toronto's Greenwood Raceway, it was moved to Woodbine Racetrack in 1957. The race was contested on dirt through 2003 when it was moved to the turf for the 2004 edition. It has been run at a distance of six furlongs except for 1957 and 1958 when it was run at seven furlongs.

The race was upgraded to Grade II status for 2010, fell to a Grade III, and restored as a Grade II event in 2014. In 2018, the Jockey Club of Canada moved it to Grade I status.

The event was downgraded to Grade II in 2022.

Records
Speed  record: 
 1:07.13 - Long On Value (2018)

Most wins:
 2 - Signature Red (2010, 2011)
 2 - Stutz Bearcat (1979, 1980)
 2 - Wake At Noon (2000, 2002)
 2 - Soaring Free (2004, 2005)
 2 - Smart Enough (2007, 2009)

Most wins by an owner:
 6 - Sam-Son Farm (1973, 1978, 1979, 1980, 2004, 2005)

Most wins by a jockey:
 4 - Todd Kabel (1997, 2003, 2004, 2005)

Most wins by a trainer:
 4 - Lou Cavalaris, Jr. (1959, 1964, 1969, 1977)

Winners

* In 1994 there was a dead heat for first.

See also
 List of Canadian flat horse races

References

 The Highlander Stakes at Pedigree Query
 The 2007 Highlander Stakes at Woodbine Entertainment
 The 2007 Highlander Stakes at the NTRA with video

Grade 1 stakes races in Canada
Open sprint category horse races
Recurring sporting events established in 1954
Woodbine Racetrack
1954 establishments in Ontario